Giulio Cesare Luini (Varallo Sesia, 1512- After 1565) was an Italian painter. Giulio was a colleague of Gaudenzio Ferrari in the decoration of the Sacro Monte di Varallo.

References

1512 births
Year of death missing
People from Varallo Sesia
16th-century Italian painters
Italian male painters
Painters from Milan